Tokyo Dome Live in Concert is a live album by American rock band Van Halen, released on March 31, 2015. It is their first live album with original lead vocalist David Lee Roth and second live album overall after 1993's Live: Right Here, Right Now.

This album is the final live album to be released during Eddie Van Halen's lifetime, before his death on October 6, 2020 and is also their last release as a band, as they dissolved after Eddie's death.

History
The official press release announcing the album arrived on February 5, 2015. This was only after the information leaked a couple days earlier and after months of speculation.

The album is Van Halen's first live album with their original lead singer David Lee Roth and third bassist Wolfgang Van Halen. The album features songs from every Roth-fronted Van Halen album, including their 2012 release, A Different Kind of Truth.  However, the album has been criticized for Roth's vocal performance.

According to Eddie Van Halen, the band originally wanted to remix 25 original song demos that Van Halen had done before they were signed to a major label, however, the original tapes could not be found. They then considered releasing recordings of their early club performances, but the sound quality was deemed too poor. As a result, it was decided to choose a concert recording from their A Different Kind of Truth Tour. According to Eddie, they had a Pro Tools workstation attached to their mixing board each night of that tour.

The cover artwork is an update of an existing 1935 painting of the SS Normandie by Cassandre.

Track listing

Personnel
David Lee Roth – lead vocals, acoustic guitar on "Ice Cream Man"
Eddie Van Halen – guitar, backing vocals
Wolfgang Van Halen – bass, backing vocals
Alex Van Halen – drums

Charts

References

2015 live albums
Van Halen live albums
Albums recorded at the Tokyo Dome
Warner Records live albums